Anthony Olgrid Sarausky (April 7, 1913 – June 21, 1990) was an American football quarterback in the National Football League. He played for the New York Giants and Brooklyn Dodgers. He played college football for the Fordham Rams. In his later years, he lived in Littleton, New Hampshire, teaching and coaching football at the town's high school and also working as an auxiliary fireman and a sportscaster for the local radio station.

References

1913 births
1990 deaths
American football quarterbacks
New York Giants players
Brooklyn Dodgers (NFL) players
Fordham Rams football players